Shepherd Stadium is a baseball stadium in Colonial Heights, Virginia which is home to the Tri-City Chili Peppers, a collegiate summer baseball team in the Coastal Plain League. Shepherd Stadium also hosts American Legion Post 284 baseball, the annual Optimist Club Boys' Invitational Baseball Tournament, Colonial Heights High School baseball, and city Rec and Parks youth baseball and softball programs. The stadium was built in 1948 and named for Mayor Fred R. Shepherd in 1951. A five-year renovation project was concluded in 2018.

References

External links
 
 Tri-City Chili Peppers - official site
 Coastal Plain League - official site

1948 establishments in Virginia
Baseball venues in Virginia
Buildings and structures in Colonial Heights, Virginia
Sports venues completed in 1948